Gary Garfinkel (September 25, 1962 – May 25, 2018) was an American television executive.

Early life
Garfinkel graduated from Cinnaminson (NJ) High School in 1980 and from Boston University with a bachelor's degree in finance and the New York University Stern School of Business.

Career
Garfinkel began his career at Salomon Brothers. He subsequently worked for Sony Pictures Entertainment, and he joined Showtime Networks in 1993. In 2012, he became co-head of its acquisitions department with Kent Sevener.

Death
Garfinkel died on May 25, 2018 at the age of 55.

References

1962 births
2018 deaths
Boston University School of Management alumni
New York University Stern School of Business alumni
American television executives
Showtime (TV network) personnel